Mark Wilford (born January 27, 1959, Boulder, Colorado) is an American rock climber and alpinist known for his bold, traditional  style.

Biography
Wilford graduated from Poudre High School in Fort Collins, Colorado in 1977 and attended the University of Colorado at Boulder for one semester.  He began climbing in 1970, and became a leading rock climber while still in high school, gradually adding bold ice climbing, alpine rock and alpine mixed routes to his accomplishments. Wilford is considered a staunch traditionalist when it comes to the style and ethics of climbing.
 
Wilford works as a Sales Representative for Julbo, La Sportiva, Sterling and Metolius.
He is a climbing ambassador for Patagonia.

He was married in 2002 and lives in Fort Collins with his wife and two children.

Notable climbs
1976 Diagonal Direct, (V 5.9 A4 800'), Longs Peak, RMNP, Colorado, USA.  First winter ascent with Ken Duncan.
1981 Hypertension (5.12b) and Remote Control (5.12c) Vedauwoo, Wyoming, USA.  First ascent with Skip Guerin.
1983 Gray Pillar/D7, (V1 5.9 A4 1500'), Longs Peak, RMNP, Colorado, USA.  Winter solo enchainment.
1984 Risky Business, (IV 5.11+ R/X 800'), Chiefs Head, RMNP, Colorado, USA.  FA with Jeff Lowe.
1985 Bird Brain Boulevard, (IV WI5 M6, 1000'), Ouray, Colorado, USA.  FA with Jeff Lowe (climber) and Charlie Fowler.
1988 Original Route, (ED2), North Face of The Eiger, Bernese Oberland, Switzerland.  First American solo ascent.
1991 North Face/North Ridge, (VI 5.9 A3), Mount Alberta, Canadian Rockies, Canada.  Solo ascent.
1992 Run for Cover, (VII 5.11 A3, 1000m), Trango Tower, Karakorum, Pakistan.  FA with Greg Child.
1999 Pugilist at Rest, (VI 5.10 A3 M5, 1000m), Mount Alverstone, Saint Elias Mountains, Canada.  FA with Barry Blanchard.
2000 The Southeast Face (VI 5.10 A1, 1050m), The Battleaxe, Kangikitsoq Fjord, Greenland.  First ascent with Mark Richey, Aug 8–9, 2000.
2000 The West Pillar (V 5.11 R, 575m), The Warrior, Kangikitsoq Fjord, Greenland.  First ascent with Mark Richey, Aug 15, 2000.
2001 Barbarossa, (VI 5.9 A2 M5), North Face of Yamandaka, Karakorum, India.  FA with Mark Richey.
2018 "Old Man of Stoer"
2019 “Picu Uriellu”

Bibliography
 Alone on the North Face of Alberta, in The High Lonesome, Epic Solo Climbing Stories edited by John Long, Globe Pequot Press, Guilford, CT, USA, 1999.

References

External links
Wilford's Bio at Patagonia Ambassadors

American mountain climbers
1959 births
Living people